In negotiation, consistency, or the consistency principle, refers to a negotiator's strong psychological need to be consistent with prior acts and statements. The consistency principle states that people are motivated toward cognitive consistency and will change their attitudes, beliefs, perceptions and actions to achieve it. Robert Cialdini and his research team have conducted extensive research into what Cialdini refers to as the 'Consistency Principle of Persuasion'. Described in his book Influence Science and Practice, this principle states that people live up to what they have publicly said they will do and what they have written down. Cialdini encourages people to have others write down their commitments as a route to having others live up to their promises.

References

Negotiation